The Fair Play for Cuba Committee (FPCC) was an activist group set up in New York City by Robert Taber in April 1960.

History

The FPCC's purpose was to provide grassroots support for the Cuban Revolution against attacks by the United States government, once Fidel Castro began openly admitting his commitment to Marxism and began the expropriation and nationalization of Cuban assets belonging to U.S. corporations. The FPCC opposed the Bay of Pigs invasion of 1961, the imposition of the United States embargo against Cuba, and was sympathetic to the Cuban view during the Cuban Missile Crisis of 1962. Its members were placed under surveillance by the FBI.

Subsidiary Fair Play for Cuba groups were set up throughout the United States and Canada.

Members (incomplete)
 Norman Mailer
 William Appleman Williams
 William Worthy
 Truman Capote
 James Baldwin
 Jack Barnes
 Jean-Paul Sartre
 Allen Ginsberg
 Lawrence Ferlinghetti
 Waldo Frank
 Alan Sagner
 Carleton Beals
 Lee Harvey Oswald
 Farrell Dobbs
 Joseph Hansen
 Richard Thomas Gibson (13 May 1931 — ?)

Archives 

 George E. Rennar Papers. 1933-1972. 37.43 cubic feet. At the Labor Archives of Washington, University of Washington Libraries Special Collections. Contains materials about the Fair Play for Cuba Committee.

References

Advocacy groups in the United States
Aftermath of the Cuban Revolution
Cuba solidarity groups
Cuba–United States relations
1960 establishments in the United States
1960s in Cuba